Bethlehem Steel F.C. may refer to:

 Bethlehem Steel F.C. (1907–30), a five-time cup-winning  American soccer club.
 Philadelphia Union II, a USL Championship soccer club formerly known as Bethlehem Steel FC.